Saifoudine Sanali (born 16 June 1995) is a Comorian professional footballer who plays as a midfielder for the French club us le pontet grand avignon.

Sanali is a youth product of the PSG academy, and has spent his footballing career in the lower leagues of France.

International career
Sanali made his debut for the Comoros national football team in a 1–1 tie in the 2018 COSAFA Cup to Seychelles on 27 May 2018.<

References

External links
 
 
 Comoros Football Profile

1995 births
Living people
People from Moroni, Comoros
Comorian footballers
Comoros international footballers
Association football midfielders
Comorian expatriate footballers
Comorian expatriate sportspeople in France
Expatriate footballers in France